A by-election for the Australian House of Representatives seat of Mayo took place on Saturday 28 July 2018, following the resignation of incumbent Centre Alliance MP Rebekha Sharkie.

In early counting, within an hour of the close of polls, the Australian Broadcasting Corporation's psephologist Antony Green's electoral computer had predicted Sharkie to retain the electorate with an increased margin.

The by-election occurred on the same day as four other by-elections for the House of Representatives, colloquially known as Super Saturday.

Background
Due to the High Court ruling against Senator Katy Gallagher on 9 May 2018 as part of the ongoing parliamentary eligibility crisis, Sharkie and three other MPs in the same situation announced their parliamentary resignations later that day, while the Perth incumbent resigned for family reasons. The Speaker announced on 24 May 2018 that he had scheduled the by-elections to occur on 28 July 2018. Popularly labelled "Super Saturday", the occurrence of five simultaneous federal by-elections is unprecedented in Australian political history. The others are:
2018 Braddon by-election
2018 Fremantle by-election
2018 Longman by-election
2018 Perth by-election

Liberal candidate Georgina Downer deleted her Twitter account on 13 June 2018, claiming that trolls had been attacking her with bad language, with counterclaims from Twitter users that she had deleted legitimate policy questions posted to her Facebook account.

Historically, the rural seat of Mayo has been a comfortably safe Liberal seat in two-party terms, though over the past two decades, the Liberals in Mayo had been repeatedly left vulnerable by several strong election results from minor parties and independents. Mayo was represented by Liberal candidate Georgina Downer's father, Alexander Downer, for the first 24 years of Mayo's 34-year history. Further back, others in the Downer family including a Premier of South Australia represented overlapping geographical areas, in the federal seat of Angas and the state seats of Barossa and Encounter Bay.

Key dates
Key dates in relation to the by-election are:
 Friday, 11 May 2018 – Speaker acceptance of resignation 
 Friday, 15 June 2018 – Issue of writ
 Friday, 22 June 2018 – Close of electoral rolls (8pm)
 Thursday, 5 July 2018 – Close of nominations (12 noon)
 Friday, 6 July 2018 – Declaration of nominations (12 noon)
 Tuesday, 10 July 2018 – Start of early voting
 Saturday, 28 July 2018 – Polling day (8am to 6pm)
 Friday, 10 August 2018 – Last day for receipt of postal votes
 Sunday, 23 September 2018 – Last day for return of writs

Candidates

The Family First Party (now the Australian Conservatives) contested Mayo at the last election on 4.6% (−2.5%) but declined to contest the by-election.

Polling

Results

See also
July 2018 Australian federal by-elections
List of Australian federal by-elections
2017–18 Australian parliamentary eligibility crisis

References

External links
2018 Mayo by-election website: Australian Electoral Commission
2018 Mayo by-election guide: Antony Green ABC
2018 Mayo by-election guide: The Poll Bludger
2018 Mayo by-election guide: The Tally Room
By-elections aplenty: The Poll Bludger 10 May 2018
Super Saturday July 28: The Poll Bludger 24 May 2018

2018 elections in Australia
South Australian federal by-elections